Kertomesis amphicalyx is a moth in the family Autostichidae. It was described by Edward Meyrick in 1911. It is found in India.

The wingspan is 11–13 mm. The forewings are ochreous white with a moderate blackish basal fascia, the posterior edge nearly straight. The plical and first discal stigmata are minute and black, the plical beneath the first discal. There is a moderate blackish fascia at about three-fifths, constricted in the middle and several undefined dots or groups of blackish scales around the apical part of the costa and upper part of the termen. The hindwings are grey.

References

Moths described in 1911
Kertomesis
Taxa named by Edward Meyrick